Xie Yao Quan (born 1984) is a Singaporean politician. A member of the governing People's Action Party (PAP), he has been the Member of Parliament (MP) representing the Jurong Central division of Jurong GRC since 2020.

Education 
Xie was educated at Raffles Institution and Raffles Junior College. He holds a Bachelor of Science degree in biomedical engineering and Master of Science degree in engineering management from Duke University.

Career 
Xie served as an officer in the Singapore Armed Forces (SAF), where he held various command appointments and helped develop future strategic requirements for the SAF. After leaving the army, he was a vice president in an investment management company with interests in real estate, hospitality and other sectors in the Southeast Asia region and China. He is currently Head of Healthcare Redesign in Alexandra Hospital, a member of National University Health System (NUHS).

In the 2020 general election, Xie was introduced by Tharman Shanmugaratnam on 29 June 2020 as a prospective candidate of the People's Action Party (PAP) team that would be contesting in Jurong GRC, replacing Ivan Lim who withdrew. Described by Tharman as a hard worker, Xie had been volunteering in the community since 2015 and was well known to the residents and grassroots volunteers. On 10 July 2020, Xie was elected to Parliament, defeating the opposition party from Red Dot United (RDU).

Volunteer work 
Xie serves on the Singapore Road Safety Council, the Board of SG Enable and the Merdeka Generation Communications and Engagement Taskforce. Prior to his appointment as a Member of Parliament, he was also an active grassroots leader, helping to start a football and study programme for students, an inclusive community initiative focusing on persons with disabilities and seniors, and a community gardening movement. He was also the Vice-Chairman of the Jurong Spring Citizens' Consultative Committee.

Personal life 
Xie is a maternal cousin of Ong Ye Kung, the Minister for Health and PAP Member of Parliament for Sembawang GRC. Xie is married.

References

External links 
 Xie Yao Quan on Parliament of Singapore
 Xie Yao Quan on Facebook

1985 births
Living people
Singaporean people of Chinese descent
People's Action Party politicians
Raffles Institution alumni
Raffles Junior College alumni
Duke University Pratt School of Engineering alumni
Members of the Parliament of Singapore